City of Spades  is a novel written by Colin MacInnes published in 1957 and the first book in what is described as MacInnes’s "London Trilogy", the other two titles being Absolute Beginners (1959) and Mr Love & Justice (1960). Following the adventures of Johnny Fortune, a recently arrived Nigerian immigrant, the novel bears witness to the emergent black culture in London in the late 1950s.

References 

1957 novels
Fiction set in the 1950s
Novels set in London
Novels by Colin MacInnes
MacGibbon & Kee books